Cicatrix is a genus of wasp found in Australia. It was erected in 2011 following a revision of Mikeius.

Species within Cicatrix:
 Cicatrix pilosiscutum (Girault, 1929)
 Cicatrix neumanoides Paretas-Martínez & Restrepo-Ortiz, 2011
 Cicatrix schauffi (Girault, 1929)

References 

Hymenoptera genera
Insects described in 2011
Cynipoidea